CFRN is a Canadian Class A, 50,000 watt (directional at night) radio station in Edmonton, Alberta. CFRN is unusual in that it is a Class A (protected nighttime skywave) AM station on a regional frequency. Owned by Bell Media and broadcasting on 1260 AM, the station airs a sports format, branded as TSN 1260 Edmonton. The station's studios are located at 18520 Stony Plain Road in Edmonton, where it shares studio space with its sister station, CFRN-DT.

As of February 28, 2021, CFRN is the 17th-most-listened-to radio station in the Edmonton market according to a PPM data report released by Numeris.

History

Early History 
In 1927, the Christian and Missionary Alliance launched the original station as CHMA at 580 kHz. In 1934, CHMA became CFTP after Taylor & Pearson Ltd. took over the station in an agreement that allowed the Christian and Missionary Alliance to maintain airtime on Sundays.

On November 1, 1934, the first license for the CFRN call letters was issued to Dr. G. R. A. "Dick" Rice" and his company, Sunwapta Broadcasting Co. Ltd., who had recently purchased CFTP from Taylor and Pearson Ltd. after financial troubles. CFRN began broadcasting on November 3, 1934 at the 1260 kHz frequency. On September 13, 1936, the station moved to 960 kHz and remained there until 1941 when they returned to 1260 kHz, a frequency they still occupy today.

In 1944 station became a network affiliate of CBC Radio's Dominion Network. It remained an affiliate of the main CBC Radio network until 1964 when CBR launched.

FM simulcast began in 1951 on CFRN-FM which lasted until 1964 when the FM network began offering its own content. CFRN-FM became fully separate from CFRN in 1979. Sunwapta brought television to Edmonton in 1954 when CFRN-TV signed on.

According to the 1976 B.B.M. Weekly Reach survey, CFRN was the 4th-most-listened-to radio station in Edmonton.

Sunwapta merged with Electrohome in 1988. Electrohome exited radio in 1996, selling CFRN to Standard Broadcasting.

On July 1, 1998, CFRN flipped from adult standards to oldies, debuting Standard Radio's new oldies network, with CISL in Vancouver, delivered via Anik satellite. The new oldies network replaced the former Satellite Radio Network service.

Switch to sports radio

In June 2002, CFRN flipped to sports radio as The Team 1260, as an affiliate of CHUM Radio's The Team network. However, the network folded shortly afterwards. CFRN would maintain its branding as The Team as a locally programmed format, while adding syndicated programs such as Prime Time Sports and The Jim Rome Show. In 2007, Standard Radio was acquired by Astral Media. In turn, Astral Media was acquired by Bell Media on July 5, 2013—the acquisition re-united CFRN with its television sister, and with The Team's former owned-and-operated stations.

On September 30, 2013, CFRN was re-branded as a part of Bell's TSN Radio network, as TSN Radio 1260, introducing a new lineup of local afternoon programming.

Former shows and games

 The Mark Spector Show - Hosted by Mark Spector
 Cracker-Cats Show - Hosted by Al Coates
 Sports-Xtra - Hosted by Tony Fiorello and Ron Rimer
 Edmonton Cracker-Cats live play-by-play - Games were carried on the Team 1260 during the first two years of the franchise.  Al Coates handled the play by play
 Total Sports - Hosted by Bob Stauffer; featuring the 'Total Sports Dream Team' of co-hosts
 What's Going On - Hosted by Jason Jones, Corey Graham and Nadine Woudstra
 Sports Talk - Hosted by John Short
 More on Sports - featuring play-by-play veteran Bryn Griffiths and Jake Daniels (the "voice of the fan").
 Way Offside - Hosted by Jake Daniels
 The Pipeline Show - Hockey program hosted by Global Edmonton's Dean Millard and columnist Guy Flaming
 The Ultimate Soccer Show - 3 hour Soccer program hosted by "Soccersteve" Steve O'Boyle

Live sports
CFRN is the flagship station for the following team's radio broadcasts:

 Edmonton Oil Kings (WHL hockey)
 Spruce Grove Saints AJHL hockey (select games)
 University of Alberta Golden Bears football and hockey games (select games)

References

External links

 

Frn
Frn
Frn
Sport in Edmonton
Radio stations established in 1927
1927 establishments in Alberta
FRN